The Bursa Cup is a tournament for professional female tennis players played on outdoor clay courts. The event was classified as a $60,000 ITF Women's Circuit tournament and held 2015–2017 in Bursa, Turkey.

Past finals

Singles

Doubles

External links
  
 ITF search

 
ITF Women's World Tennis Tour
Clay court tennis tournaments
Tennis tournaments in Turkey
Sport in Bursa
Recurring sporting events established in 2015
2015 establishments in Turkey